is a Japanese footballer currently playing as a midfielder for Nagano Parceiro.

Career statistics

Club
Updated to January 1st, 2022.

Notes

References

External links

Profile at Vanraure Hachinohe

1992 births
Living people
Japanese footballers
Association football midfielders
Japan Football League players
J3 League players
ReinMeer Aomori players
FC Imabari players
Vanraure Hachinohe players
AC Nagano Parceiro players